Poblet Abbey, otherwise the Royal Abbey of Santa Maria de Poblet, is a Cistercian monastery, founded in 1151, located at the foot of the Prades Mountains, in the comarca of Conca de Barberà, in Catalonia (Spain). It was founded by Cistercian monks from France. The main architect was Arnau Bargués.

This monastery was the first of three sister monasteries, known as the Cistercian triangle, that helped consolidate power in Catalonia in the 12th century. (The other two are Vallbona de les Monges and Santes Creus.)

Significance
Poblet was one of the two royal pantheons of the kings of the Crown of Aragon since James I of Aragon (along with Monastery of San Juan de la Peña). Some of the most important royal sepulchres have alabaster statues that lie over the tomb. The kings have lion sculptures at their feet, while the queens have dogs.

Peter IV of Aragon (1319 – 1387) made it a condition, under solemn oath at the moment of crowning, that all the Aragonese kings be buried there. Only Ferdinand II of Aragon broke the oath, after his kingdom had been merged with the Kingdom of Castile, and was buried in Granada.

At the height of its splendor, the monastery was home to more than 300 monks and had numerous "Cistercian farms" run by lay brothers who exploited its agricultural land and forests. The monastery buildings occupy about 12,000 m2.

Burials
The following kings and queens of Aragon are buried at Poblet Monastery:

Alfonso II (1196)
James I (1276)
Peter IV (1387), and his first three wives Maria of Navarre, Eleanor of Portugal, and Eleanor of Sicily
John I (1396), and his wives, Martha of Armagnac and Violant of Bar 
Martin (1410), and his first wife, Maria de Luna
Ferdinand I (1416), and his wife, Eleanor of Alburquerque
Alfonso V (1458)
John II (1479), and his second wife, Joana Enríquez

Additional notable figures interred here include the Hungarian queen Beatrice of Naples (1508), Philip Wharton, 1st Duke of Wharton (1731) and Archduke Carlos Píus of Austria-Tuscany (1953).

The tombs of the royals were restored by the Catalan sculptor Frederic Marés in 1948.

Ruin and rebuilding
The monastery, which had already suffered damage during the First Carlist War, was closed down due to the Ecclesiastical Confiscations of Mendizábal in 1835 during Isabella II of Spain's rule. The Desamortización or secularization of the place brought monastic life to an end.
On 24 July of the same year the monastery was plundered by representatives of the Mendizábal's government and unruly mobs. During the events all valuable paintings and furniture were removed and dispersed. Also parts of the monastery were destroyed by fire.

In the years that followed, the Monastery fell into disrepair and ruin; some of the main roofs caved in. The tombs of the rulers of the Kingdom of Aragon were desecrated and the remains were transferred and kept for a while in the Cathedral of Tarragona, thanks to the intervention of Rev. Antoni Serret from the neighboring town of L'Espluga.

Finally the monastery was refounded in 1940 by Italian monks of the same order and repair and reconstruction began. Close to the entrance of the church one building has been kept in a ruined state as a reminder. Remains of the deceased of the ancient Royal House of Aragon were put back in sepulchres, but are now co-mingled.

Poblet belongs to the Cistercian Congregation of the Crown of Aragon, along with Santa Maria de Solius and convents such as Santa Maria de Vallbona and Santa Maria de Valldonzella. The Abbot of Poblet is the ex officio chairman of the Congregation. Today the monastic community of Poblet is composed of 29 professed monks, 1 regular oblate, 1 novice and 2 familiars.

Poblet Monastery has been a UNESCO World Heritage Site since 1991.  The altar (1527) was sculpted by Damián Forment.

In 2010, Spanish architect Mariano Bayón designed the Poblet Monastery Guesthouse.

Abbots 
The current abbot is the 105th abbot.
 1954–1966 :Edmon Maria Garreta i Olivella
 1966–1970 :Robert Saladrigues
 1970–1998 :Maurus Esteva Alsina
 1998–2015 :Josep Alegre i Vilas
 2015–current :Octavi Vilà i Mayo

Gallery

See also
 Crown of Aragon
 Organ of Poblet
 Pedro Antonio de Aragón, patron

References

External links

The "Montserrat Tarradellas i Macià" Archive (in Catalan, Spanish and English)
Monestir de Poblet Official website 
Photos, Multimedia Resources of Abbey
Monestirs de Catalunya. Poblet (Catalan only)
 

Monasteries in Catalonia
Cistercian monasteries in the Crown of Aragon
Cistercian monasteries in Spain
World Heritage Sites in Catalonia
1151 establishments in Europe
Religious organizations established in the 1150s
Catalan symbols
Basilica churches in Spain
Romanesque architecture in Catalonia
Christian monasteries established in the 12th century
Bien de Interés Cultural landmarks in the Province of Tarragona
Articles containing video clips
Burial sites of the House of Barcelona
Burial sites of Aragonese royal houses
Burial sites of the House of Trastámara
Conca de Barberà